St. John’s North is a defunct provincial electoral district for the House of Assembly of Newfoundland and Labrador, Canada. As of 2011 there were 8,779 eligible voters living within the district.

The district included a large section of central-northern St. John's. Includes commercial areas such as Kenmount Road, the Avalon Mall and the O’Leary industrial park. Stretches along Thorburn Road and takes in half of Pippy Park, including the Health Science Centre and the northern half of Memorial University. It was replaced in 2015 largely by the district of Mount Scio.

Members of the House of Assembly
The district has elected the following Members of the House of Assembly:

Election results

|-
 
|NDP
|Dale Kirby
|align="right"|2,595
|align="right"|55.20 
|align="right"|+45.22
|-

|-

|}

|-

|-

|-
 
|NDP
|Matt Power
|align="right"|449
|align="right"|9.98%
|align="right"|
|}

|-

|-

|-
 
|NDP
|Liam Walsh
|align="right"|820
|align="right"|
|align="right"|
|}

|-

|-
 
|NDP
|Dale Kirby
|align="right"|788
|align="right"|
|align="right"|
|}

 
|NDP
|Raj Sharan
|align="right"|510
|align="right"|10.3
|align="right"|
|-
|}

 
|NDP
|Sara Rich
|align="right"|810
|align="right"|
|align="right"|
|-
|}

 
|NDP
|Dorothy Inglis
|align="right"|495
|align="right"|
|align="right"|
|-
|}

 
|NDP
|Dorothy Inglis
|align="right"|1431
|align="right"|
|align="right"|

|-
|}

 
|NDP
|Austin Scott
|align="right"|165
|align="right"|
|align="right"|
|-
|}

References

External links 
Website of the Newfoundland and Labrador House of Assembly

Newfoundland and Labrador provincial electoral districts
Politics of St. John's, Newfoundland and Labrador